The raptor subfamily Perninae includes a number of medium-sized broad-winged species. These are birds of warmer climates, although the Pernis species (European honey buzzard and crested honey buzzard) have a more extensive range.

Several of the species in this group eat mainly insects, and the honey-buzzards are specialist feeders on wasp larvae. Reptiles are also taken by several birds in this group.

Several authorities consider Gypaetinae to be within or even synonymous with Perninae.

Taxonomy
 Subfamily Perninae
 Genus Aviceda
 African cuckoo-hawk, Aviceda cuculoides
 Madagascar cuckoo-hawk, Aviceda madagascariensis
 Jerdon's baza, Aviceda jerdoni
 Pacific baza, Aviceda subcristata
 Black baza, Aviceda leuphotes
 Genus Henicopernis
 Long-tailed honey buzzard, Henicopernis longicauda
 Black honey buzzard, Henicopernis infuscatus
 Genus Pernis
 European honey buzzard, Pernis apivorus
 Crested honey buzzard, Pernis ptilorhynchus
 Barred honey buzzard, Pernis celebensis
 Genus Elanoides
 Swallow-tailed kite Elanoides forficatus
 Genus Leptodon
 Grey-headed kite, Leptodon cayanensis
 White-collared kite, Leptodon forbesi
 Genus Chondrohierax
 Hook-billed kite, Chondrohierax uncinatus
 Cuban kite, Chondrohierax wilsonii
 Genus Pithecophaga
 Philippine eagle, Pithecophaga jefferyi

References

 

 
Bird subfamilies
Taxa named by Edward Blyth